Frank Wilton Marshall (born September 13, 1946) is an American film producer and director. He often collaborates with his wife, film producer Kathleen Kennedy, with whom he founded the production company Amblin Entertainment, along with Steven Spielberg. In 1991, he founded, with Kennedy, The Kennedy/Marshall Company, a film production company which has a contract with Amblin Partners. Since May 2012, with Kennedy taking on the role of President of Lucasfilm, Marshall has been Kennedy/Marshall's sole principal.

Marshall has worked with directors such as Spielberg, Paul Greengrass, Peter Bogdanovich, David Fincher, M. Night Shyamalan, and Robert Zemeckis. He has produced various successful film franchises, including Indiana Jones, Back to the Future, and Bourne and has received five nominations for the Academy Award for Best Picture. His other accolades include the Irving G. Thalberg Memorial Award, bestowed by the Academy of Motion Picture Arts and Sciences to "creative producers, whose bodies of work reflect a consistently high quality of motion picture production", the David O. Selznick Achievement Award in Theatrical Motion Pictures, a Grammy Award, and a Tony Award.

Life and career 
Born in Glendale, California, Marshall is the son of guitarist, conductor and composer Jack Marshall. His early years were spent in Van Nuys, California.  In 1961, his family moved to Newport Beach, where he attended Newport Harbor High School, and was active in music, drama, cross country, and track. He entered UCLA in 1964 as an engineering major, and graduated in 1968 with a degree in Political science. While at UCLA, he was initiated into Alpha Tau Omega fraternity, helped create its first NCAA soccer team, and played collegiate soccer there in 1966, 1967 and 1968.

In 1966, he met film director Peter Bogdanovich at a birthday party for the daughter of director John Ford, a friend of his father. Marshall volunteered to work on Bogdanovich's first film, Targets (1968), which became his apprenticeship in film production, as he assumed various productions roles, even appearing in a bit part.  Following graduation from UCLA, Marshall spent the next two years working in Aspen and Marina del Rey, as a waiter/guitar player at "The Randy Tar," a steak and lobster restaurant.  While traveling through Europe in March 1970, he received another call from Bogdanovich, offering him a position on The Last Picture Show (1971). Three days later he arrived in Archer City, Texas, doubling as location manager and actor in this seminal film.  Under Bogdanovich's guidance, Marshall would work his way up from producer's assistant to associate producer on five more films. He branched out to work with Martin Scorsese as a line producer on the music documentary The Last Waltz (1978) and as an associate producer on director Walter Hill's gritty crime thriller, The Driver (1978). The following year, Marshall earned his first executive producer credit on Hill's cult classic street gang movie, The Warriors (1979). He continues to collaborate with Bogdanovich, working to complete their tenth film together, Orson Welles' unfinished The Other Side of the Wind in 2018.

In 1981, together with his future wife Kathleen Kennedy and Steven Spielberg, he co-founded Amblin Entertainment, one of the industry's most productive and profitable production companies.  As a producer, Marshall has received five Oscar nominations for Best Picture for The Curious Case of Benjamin Button (2008), Seabiscuit (2003), The Sixth Sense (1999), The Color Purple (1985), and Raiders of the Lost Ark (1981).
During the 1980s and 1990s, Marshall served on the advisory board of the National Student Film Institute.

His feature film directing debut was the thriller Arachnophobia (1990), starring Jeff Daniels. In 1991, he and Kennedy created The Kennedy/Marshall Company and began producing their own films.  Marshall directed the company's first film, Alive (1993), about a rugby team struggling to survive in the snow after their plane crashes in the Andes. Next, he directed Congo (1995), based on Michael Crichton's novel, followed by Eight Below (2006), an adventure about loyalty and the bonds of friendship set in the extreme wilderness of Antarctica. In 1998, he directed the episode "Mare Tranquilitatis", for the Emmy Award-winning HBO miniseries From the Earth to the Moon. As part of ESPN's 30 for 30 series, Marshall directed a documentary about Olympian Johann Olav Koss entitled Right to Play (2012). (the name of Koss's humanitarian organisation). Marshall stated that the documentary, broadcast in 2012, sought to capture not only Koss' sporting career and the ideals behind his nonprofit organization, but also his "drive and how it has changed the world."

From 1991 to 2012, The Kennedy/Marshall Company produced many films, including The Sixth Sense, Signs, Seabiscuit, The Curious Case of Benjamin Button, War Horse, Lincoln, the Bourne series and the feature documentary The Armstrong Lie (2013). Since taking over as sole principal of the company, Marshall has broadened its slate beyond feature films to include television, documentaries and Broadway musicals. In 2015, he produced the Emmy Award-nominated documentary Sinatra: All or Nothing at All for HBO and the summer blockbuster Jurassic World (2015), which has become the sixth highest-grossing film of all time. In 2020, he directed the Hélder Guimarães virtual magic shows The Present and The Future for the Geffen Stayhouse, which both had sold out runs and The Bee Gees: How Can You Mend a Broken Heart, which was released by HBO in December, 2020 and nominated for six Emmys. He is currently producing the film Jurassic World Dominion, the third film in the Jurassic World trilogy, which will be released on June 10, 2022.

Marshall is a former VP, member of the board of directors and member of the Executive Committee of the United States Olympic and Paralympic Committee (USOPC). He was awarded the Olympic Shield in 2005, and inducted into the U.S. Olympic Hall of Fame class of 2008 for his years of service to the USOPC.

Currently, he serves on the board of Athletes for Hope, LA's Promise Fund, as Board Chair of The Archer School for Girls, and on the UCLA School of Theater, Film & Television Executive Board. He is a recipient of the Golden Plate Award of the American Academy of Achievement presented alongside Kathleen Kennedy by Awards Council member George Lucas, the UCLA Alumni Professional Achievement Award and the California Mentor Initiative's Leadership Award.  In June 2004, Marshall gave the Commencement Address at the UCLA College of Letters and Science graduation ceremony in Pauley Pavilion.

Marshall enjoys magic and music and has performed under the moniker of "Dr. Fantasy" or "DJ Master Frank". Marshall and American premiere miler Steve Scott founded the Rock 'n' Roll Marathon Series, which debuted in 1998 in San Diego as the largest first-time marathon in history.

Filmography

As director

As producer

As executive producer
 The Warriors (1979)
 Twilight Zone: The Movie (1983)
 Indiana Jones and the Temple of Doom (1984)
 Back to the Future (1985)
 Batteries Not Included (1987)
 The Land Before Time (1988)
 Indiana Jones and the Last Crusade (1989)
 Back to the Future Part II (1989)
 Back to the Future Part III (1990)
 Cape Fear (1991)
 Tiny Toon Adventures: How I Spent My Vacation (1992) (Direct-to-video)
 The Bourne Identity (2002)
 Ponyo (2009) (U.S. dub production)
 Hereafter (2010)
 The Secret World of Arrietty (2012) (U.S. dub production)
 From Up on Poppy Hill (2013) (U.S. dub co-production with Studio Ghibli)
 The Wind Rises (2014) (U.S. dub co-production with Studio Ghibli)
 The Nagano Tapes (2018) 
 Laurel Canyon (2020)

As associate producer
 Daisy Miller (1974)
  The Driver (1978)

As actor

Awards and nominations

References

External links 

 

1946 births
Film producers from California
American soccer players
Inkpot Award winners
Living people
UCLA Bruins men's soccer players
University of California, Los Angeles alumni
People from Glendale, California
Film directors from California
Association footballers not categorized by position
American independent film production company founders
Grammy Award winners
Tony Award winners